Johann "Hans" Ulrich Klintzsch (4 November 1898 in Lübbenau – 17 August 1959 in Hamburg) was a naval lieutenant from the Erhardt Brigade who later served as Oberster SA-Führer, the supreme commander of the Sturmabteilung (SA), from 1921 to February 1923, when he returned to his former unit and ceded control to Hermann Göring. After his career as SA leader, he went back to the Luftwaffe. He died during the wedding of his son Fridthjof.

Decorations and awards
1914 Iron Cross 2nd Class and 1st Class
Silesian probation badge (de) (1921)
The Honour Cross of the World War 1914/1918 (1934)

References
Notes

Bibliography
 

Further reading
 Krüger, Gabriele (1971) Die Brigade Ehrhardt. Leibniz-Verlag. 
 Tyrell, Albrecht (1969) Führer befiehl. Droste. 
 Tyrell, Albrecht (1975) Vom Trommler zum Führer. Fink. 

1898 births
1959 deaths
People from Lübbenau
20th-century Freikorps personnel
Organisation Consul members
Nazi Party officials
Sturmabteilung officers
People from the Province of Brandenburg
Imperial German Navy personnel of World War I
Luftwaffe personnel of World War II
Military personnel from Brandenburg